Kenneth Akito Oye (born October 20, 1949) is an American political scientist and Professor of Political Science (School of Humanities, Arts and Social Sciences) and Data Systems and Society (School  of Engineering) at the Massachusetts Institute of Technology. He is Director of the MIT Program on Emerging Technologies and former Director of the MIT Center for International Studies.

Life
Oye graduated from Swarthmore College and from Harvard University with a Ph.D in Political Science. He is best known for publications on Regime theory and International Political Economy. His current research focuses on planned adaptation in the face of pervasive uncertainty, with applications in emerging technologies.

In 2018, Oye received the Order of the Rising Sun, Gold Rays with Rosette for his contributions to "promoting understanding of Japan in the United States."

Oye currently teaches at the Massachusetts Institute of Technology.
He is a member of the Council on Foreign Relations and a Trustee of the World Peace Foundation.

Works
 "Regulate 'home-brew' opiates." Oye et al. Nature. 521.7552 (2015): 281–283.
 "Regulating gene drives." Oye et al. Science. 345.6197 (2014): 626–628.
 “Embracing Uncertainty,” Kenneth A. Oye, Issues in Science and Technology, Vol XXVI, No 1, Fall 2009, pp 91–93.
   
 

Edited with Robert Lieber and Donald Rothchild:

References

American political scientists
Swarthmore College alumni
Harvard University alumni
MIT School of Humanities, Arts, and Social Sciences faculty
1949 births
Living people
American academics of Japanese descent
American Quakers
MIT School of Engineering faculty
Recipients of the Order of the Rising Sun, 4th class